What the Butler Saw is a British reality show that ran in 2004. It features the Callaghan extended family. The nine relatives are competing to move from lower class to the best example of nobility. The family knows they are being judged, but do not realize that the judges are the seven servants helping them through their new life.

The series was filmed at Debenham House in London's Holland Park district.

References

External links
BFI
TVNZ
UKGameshow

2004 British television series debuts
2004 British television series endings
English-language television shows
Channel 4 game shows
Television series by Endemol
2000s British reality television series
2000s British game shows